Voices from the Sky (央金玛) is the third studio album by Chinese singer Dadawa (music by He Xuntian). The album is a follow up to her second album Sister Drum, which met with controversy, critical and commercial success.

English track listing
"Melodious Goddess" - 6:26
"Ballad of Lhasa" - 5:05
"Believer" - 5:17
"Seven Drums" - 5:55
"Himalayans" - 5:08
"Sixth Dalai Lama's Love Song" - 7:09
"Question from the Other Shore" - 6:27

References
Artist Direct article
fye.com entry

1997 albums
Dadawa albums
Sire Records albums